Vamo Batê Lata is the second live album released by brazilian rock band Os Paralamas do Sucesso, launched in 1995. Vamo Batê Lata had more than 900,000 copies sold in Brazil, the most sold of the band. The album comes in 2 CDs: the first one with live tracks, and the second one with studio recordings. Vamo Batê Lata included "Luis Inácio (300 Picaretas)" and "Uma Brasileira".

Track listing

Disc one
"A Novidade" ("The Novelty") (Herbert Vianna, Bi Ribeiro, João Barone, Gilberto Gil) – 4:37
"Dos Margaritas" ("Two Daisies" - Spanish Writing) (Herbert Vianna, Bi Ribeiro) – 3:03
"Vamo Batê Lata" ("Let's Hit It")(Herbert Vianna) – 3:09
"Alagados" ("Victims Of Flood")(Herbert Vianna, Bi Ribeiro, João Barone) – 4:28
"Caleidoscópio" ("Caleidoscope")(Herbert Vianna) – 3:56
"Meu Erro" ("My Mistake")(Herbert Vianna) – 5:28
"Trac-Trac" (Fito Páez, version by Herbert Vianna) – 4:17
"O Rio Severino" ("Severino River") (Herbert Vianna) – 4:48
"Lanterna dos Afogados" ("The Drowned Ones' Light") (Herbert Vianna) – 4:56
"Um a Um"  ("One to One") (Edgar Ferreira) – 3:02
"Você / Gostava Tanto de Você" (You / Liked you so much) (Tim Maia / Edson Trindade) – 2:58
"O Beco" ("The Alley") (Herbert Vianna, Bi Ribeiro) – 2:50
"Romance Ideal" ("Ideal romance") (Martim Cardoso, Herbert Vianna) – 4:34
"Não me Estrague o Dia / Sol e Chuva" (Don't ruin my day / Sun & rain) (Herbert Vianna, Bi Ribeiro / Alceu Valença) – 2:45

Disc two
"Uma Brasileira" ("A brazilian girl") (Djavan, Herbert Vianna) – 3:40
"Saber Amar" ("To know How To Love") (Herbert Vianna) – 3:24
"Luis Inácio (300 Picaretas)" ("300 Jerks")(Herbert Vianna) – 3:19
"Esta Tarde" ("This afternoon") (Herbert Vianna) – 3:04

Personnel
Paralamas do Sucesso
Herbert Vianna - vocals, guitar, production
Bi Ribeiro - bass guitar, production
João Barone - drums, production

Additional musicians
João Fera - keyboards
Eduardo Lyra - percussion
Monteiro Jr. - saxophone
Senô Bezerra - trombone
Demétrio Bezerra - trumpet, flugelhorn
Charly García - piano on "Saber Amar"
Maurício Barros - Hammond organ
Ernie Watts - tenor saxophone
Jairo Cliff - vocals on "Luis Inácio"

Production
Carlos Savalla - co-production on "Uma Brasileira" and "Saber Amar"
Liminha - co-production on "Uma Brasileira" and "Luis Inácio"
Vitor Farias - recording, mixing
Marcelo Sabóia - piano recording
Larry Reed - sax recording
Ronaldo Lima - organ recording
Ricardo Essucy - mastering
Marco Aurélio - studio assistant
Pedro Ribeiro - production Assistant
Chico Neves - samplers, programming

Design
Gringo Cardia - artwork
Leonardo Eyer - art assistant and CG

References

Os Paralamas do Sucesso live albums
1995 live albums
EMI Records live albums